Peter Ovtcharov (born December 31, 1981 in Leningrad) is a Russian classical pianist and composer currently residing in Seoul, South Korea. He studied at the Universität Mozarteum Salzburg with German teacher Karl-Heinz Kämmerling and won several prizes and awards, including the Second Prize at the International Vladimir Krainev Competition in Kharkiv, Ukraine (1992), Silver Medaille at the 3rd International Tchaikovsky Competition for Young Musicians (ex aequo with Korean pianist Son Yeol-Eum, 1997), the First Prize at the National Austrian competition "Gradus ad Parnassum" (2004), Silvio Bengalli Piano Prize (Italy, 2004) and the Third Prize at the International Beethoven Competition in Vienna (2005). In 2006, he received the Luitpold Prize of the Year from the prestigious German festival "Kissinger Sommer".

Teaching 

Recently, Peter Ovtcharov is a Professor of Yonsei University.

He is giving numerous concerts, masterclasses and lectures in Europe and Asia.

Composition 

His compositions include works for piano solo (released 2021 as an album), chamber music, as well the symphonic poem "The Battle".

Discography 

 Rachmaninoff Etudes-Tableaux (Complete) (2003, ram Germany)
 Chopin Mazurkas (Complete) (2006, ram Germany, 2 CD)
 Rabl, Zemlinsky: Trios and Quartets with Eggner, Zimper, Suklar (2020, Gramola 99228)
 Peter Ovtcharov. Piano Works (Davidsbündler 21 Records, 2021)

Family 

His father is a notable Russian movie director and scriptwriter Sergei Ovtcharov, winner of numerous international prizes, including Golden Bear at the Berlin Film Festival and nominations for the Palme d'Or in Cannes Film Festival.

References

External links 
 Peter Ovtcharov on the homepage of Austrian Music Festival Allegro Vivo
 Peter Ovtcharov on the Korean concert database
 Peter Ovtcharov on Youtube

1981 births
Living people
Russian classical pianists
Male classical pianists
21st-century classical pianists
21st-century Russian male musicians